Janet Achieng Otieno (born 24 December 1977) popularly known as Janet Otieno, is a singer and songwriter of gospel music from Kenya. She was the winner of Mwafaka Awards and nominated at Groove Awards for "Collaboration of the year" in 2014 for the song "Napokea Kwako" which featured Christina Shusho from Tanzania.

Early life and career 
Janet gained interest in music in the year 2010 when she started singing in the church. She later released her first song in the year 2013 "Napokea Kwako" which featured Tanzanian gospel singer Christina Shusho. The song gained her much attention and fame and in 2014, she was awarded for "Collaboration of the year for the song "Napokea Kwako" by Mwafaka Awards. She later released other songs such as Mtafute, Ni Wewe, Nijaze, Nitangoja, Tulia, Amka Ucheze, More of you,  Heshima and Uniongoze. In 2014 she was nominated for Female artist of the year, Collaboration of the year and Song of the year by Groove Awards and in 2018 she was nominated as the Best Female Artiste in African Inspirational Music at Afrima Awards.

Discography

Singles 

 Napokea Kwako Featuring Christina Shusho (2013)
 Uniongoze (2013)
 Heshima (2014)
 Ni wewe (2014)
 Mtafute (2014)
 Tembea Nami (2015)
 Nisamehe (2015)
 Roho Wako (2015)
 Nifunze (2016)
 More Of You (2016)
 Roho Mtakatifu (2016)
 Bisha (2017)
 Shuka (2017)
 Narudi (2018)
 Asante (2018)
 Pokea (2019)
 Nijaze (2020)
 Nitangoja(2020)
 Unconditional Love (2021)

Awards and nominations

Personal life 
Born 24 December 1977, Janet Achieng Otieno is the second born in a family of six children. Janet is married to Alfred Otieno whom they met in church while singing in redeemed gospel church and got married in 1996.

References

External links 

 

21st-century Kenyan women singers
Living people
1977 births
People from Kisumu County
Kenyan Christians
Gospel singers
Kenyan gospel musicians